The Darling Buds of May may refer to:

 The Darling Buds of May (novel), a 1958 novel by H. E. Bates
 The Darling Buds of May (TV series), a 1991–1993 TV series based on the novel
 The Mating Game (film), a 1959 film adaptation
 The Larkins (2021 TV series)
 Darling Buds of May (album), a 2006 album by the rock band Faulter
 "Darling Buds of May", a 2011 song by Viva Brother from Famous First Words
"The darling buds of May", a quote from William Shakespeare's Sonnet 18

See also
 The Darling Buds